Jesen Dygestile-Therrien (born March 18, 1993) is a Canadian former professional baseball pitcher. He has played in Major League Baseball (MLB) for the Philadelphia Phillies.

Career

Philadelphia Phillies
Therrien was drafted by the Phillies in the 17th round of the 2011 MLB Draft after having previously been drafted by the New York Mets in the 36th round of the 2010 MLB Draft.

Therrien was selected as a member of the Canada national baseball team at the 2017 World Baseball Classic.

On July 28, 2017, the Phillies promoted Therrien to the major leagues. He made his MLB debut the following day against the Atlanta Braves surrendering a double and then retiring the next 3 batters.

On September 21, 2017, Therrien underwent Tommy John surgery, and was out for the rest of the year.

Los Angeles Dodgers
He elected free agency on November 7, 2017 and signed a two-year minor league contract with the Los Angeles Dodgers a few weeks later. He did not play in 2018 while recovering from his surgery. He was assigned to AAA Oklahoma City Dodgers and was placed on the injured list to start the 2019 season.

References

External links

1993 births
Living people
Baseball people from Quebec
Black Canadian baseball players
Canadian expatriate baseball players in the United States
Canadian people of French descent
Clearwater Threshers players
Glendale Desert Dogs players
Florida Complex League Phillies players
Lakewood BlueClaws players
Lehigh Valley IronPigs players
Major League Baseball pitchers
Major League Baseball players from Canada
Philadelphia Phillies players
Reading Fightin Phils players
Baseball players from Montreal
Williamsport Crosscutters players
World Baseball Classic players of Canada
2017 World Baseball Classic players